The Siege of Trepča was a successful assault by Mehmet the Conqueror in the second Serbian campaign in 1455.

Before the siege 
While those in the West gave up the crusade, Sultan Mehmet started his second Serbian expedition, despite the peace treaty and the benevolence he showed. Because of preparations in Hungary, he considered his promises and all related obligations invalid.

In addition, as soon as Mehmet returned to Edirne,Hungarians and Serbs took up arms and captured the environs of Nis and Kosovo. The sultan went on a campaign with his army again.

Siege 
The Serbian leader, like in 1454, did not offer open resistance. Cities and forts were equipped with troops and supplies. The villagers were advised to flee either to the castles, or to the great forests and mountains. The new capital of the state, Smederevo, was ready for a long siege. Georg took his wife and children and a few people from the palace and crossed the Danube to 
Hungary, where he had large lands and strong castles in the south. She was sure that no danger awaited her here, since she had made peace with John Hunyadi for a long time.

Mehmed directed his forces towards 
Southern Serbia in 1455. He captured the Trepça, Novobrdo and silver mines.

References 

Wars involving the Ottoman Empire
Military campaigns involving the Ottoman Empire
Battles of Mehmed the Conqueror